The Sarajevo Fashion Film Festival is an international film festival held annually in Sarajevo, Bosnia and Herzegovina. It exclusively showcases fashion films, advertising films, music videos and short documentaries on the fashion industry. It was established in 2015 by the Consortio Civium Invictum Foundation in cooperation with the London Fashion Week, Paris Fashion Week and the Madrid Fashion Film Festival.

Format
SFFF was created in order to showcase and exhibit the new fashion cinematographic genre to wider audiences as well to create an institutional background to the increasing number of fashion films produced every year by fashion magazines and fashion production companies.  The festival is held in December of every year and lasts for two days. It is made up of a competition and non-competition programme. As of 2017, the former is divided into 14 categories and includes the Dove of Sarajevo award for best overall fashion film. Further categories include Best Fashion Film, Best Music Video, Best National Film, Best New Talent, Best Photography, Best Actor, Best Actress, Best Cinematography, Best Costume Design, Best Major Brand Production, Best Make-up and Hair, Best Story, Best Visual and Special Effect and Best Documentary. The maximum length of the films shown in the competitive selection is 20 minutes.

Award winners
Selected categories:

Dove of Sarajevo

Best Fashion Film

Best Music Video

Best National Film

Best Young Director

Best Fashion Documentary

Best Cinematography

Best Actor

Best Actress

Best Costume Design

Best Major Brand Production

References

External links
 Official website

Film festivals established in 2015
December events
Tourist attractions in Sarajevo
Annual events in Bosnia and Herzegovina
Fashion industry
Film festivals in Sarajevo
2015 establishments in Bosnia and Herzegovina